"Alive" is the winner's single by season five winner of The X Factor Australia, Dami Im. It was released digitally on 28 October 2013, as the lead single from her self-titled second album. "Alive" was written and produced by DNA Songs. Four days after its release in Australia, the song debuted at number one on the ARIA Singles Chart. It was certified Platinum by the Australian Recording Industry Association for selling over 70,000 copies.

Background and release
"Alive" was written by Anthony Egizii and David Musumeci. It was also produced by Egizii and Musumeci under their production name DNA. After winning The X Factor, "Alive" was released for digital download in Australia on 28 October 2013, as Im's winner's single. On 1 November 2013, "Alive" was released for digital download in South Korea on various music sites.

Chart performance
Four days after its release in Australia, "Alive" debuted at number one on the ARIA Singles Chart with first-week sales of 44,025 copies. One day after its release in South Korea, "Alive" debuted at number 51 on the South Korea Gaon International Digital Chart, for the week spanning from 27 October 2013 to 2 November 2013. The following week, 3 November 2013 to 9 November 2013, "Alive" rose to number 29.

Live performances
Im performed "Alive" live for the first time during The X Factor grand final performance show on 27 October 2013. Im performed the song again during the grand final decider show the following day, after she was announced as the winner.

Track listing
CD / digital download
 "Alive" – 3:56

Personnel
Vocals – Dami Im
Songwriting – Anthony Egizii, David Musumeci
Production – DNA
Mixing engineer – Anthony Egizii
Guitar – David Musumeci
Background vocals – Sarah De Bono

Source:

Charts

Weekly charts

Year-end charts

Certifications

Release history

References

2010s ballads
2013 debut singles
2013 songs
Dami Im songs
Pop ballads
Songs written by David Musumeci
Songs written by Anthony Egizii
Song recordings produced by DNA Songs
Sony Music Australia singles
Number-one singles in Australia